Ginny Weasley is a fictional character in J. K. Rowling's Harry Potter novel series. Ginny is introduced in the first book Harry Potter and the Philosopher's Stone, as the youngest sibling and only daughter of Arthur and Molly Weasley. She becomes Harry's main love interest and eventually marries him at the end of the series. She is portrayed by Bonnie Wright in all eight Harry Potter films.

Character development 
Ginny is a pureblood witch born 11 August 1981, the seventh child and only daughter of Arthur and Molly Weasley. She attends Hogwarts School of Witchcraft and Wizardry, and is sorted into Gryffindor house, along with the rest of her family. J. K. Rowling says:

Over the course of the series, Ginny becomes a strong witch who shows herself to be independent and capable, fighting alongside Harry on more than one occasion as he battles against the Dark Arts.

In a joint interview with The Leaky Cauldron and Mugglenet, Rowling revealed that she "always knew" that Ginny and Harry "were going to come together and then part." Rowling explained that, as the series progresses, Harry, and by extension the reader, discovers that Ginny is in fact the ideal girl for Harry. Rowling said Harry "needs to be with someone who can stand the demands of being with Harry Potter, because he's a scary boyfriend in a lot of ways." By the later part of the series, Ginny and Harry "are total equals" and "worthy of each other." The author also commented that she enjoyed writing the "big emotional journey" both characters go through, and that she really liked Ginny as a character.

Appearances

Harry Potter and the Philosopher's Stone
Ginny first appears in Harry Potter and the Philosopher's Stone, when Harry encounters the Weasley family at King's Cross station and they help him to reach Platform 9¾. After realizing Harry's identity, Ginny asks her mother if she can board the Hogwarts Express to see him.

Harry Potter and the Chamber of Secrets
Ginny is a first-year student in Chamber of Secrets, where she develops a crush on Harry and is sorted into Gryffindor. During the climax of the story, it is revealed that she opened the Chamber of Secrets, and is attacking Muggle-born students while being possessed by Tom Riddle's old school diary. Lucius Malfoy had slipped the diary into Ginny's cauldron in Flourish and Blotts prior to the term.

Harry Potter and the Prisoner of Azkaban
Ginny has little involvement in Prisoner of Azkaban, though she is studying at Hogwarts throughout the book and grows closer to Hermione.

Harry Potter and the Goblet of Fire
In Goblet of Fire, her role was larger as she attends the Quidditch World Cup with her father, brothers, Harry and Hermione. She attends the Yule Ball with Neville Longbottom and can be seen in background appearances.

Harry Potter and the Order of the Phoenix
In Order of the Phoenix, Ginny has "given up on Harry months ago" (this is merely a ruse as Hermione previously advised her to pretend to not be as interested in Harry and go out with a few other boys so Harry would eventually notice her), and has a boyfriend, Michael Corner, whom she met at the Yule Ball. When Umbridge punishes Harry with a "lifetime" Quidditch ban, Ginny replaces him as Gryffindor Seeker. In the last part of the book, Ginny breaks up with Michael due to his sulking over Ravenclaw's defeat in the Quidditch Cup final, later replacing him with Dean Thomas. She joins Dumbledore's Army and is one of five members who accompany Harry in his attempt to rescue Sirius Black from the Department of Mysteries. Near the end of this book Ginny participates in the battle inside the Ministry of Magic, but is forced to withdraw from the action due to a broken left ankle.

Harry Potter and the Half-Blood Prince
In Half-Blood Prince, after she casts a Bat-Bogey Hex on Zacharias Smith, Professor Slughorn respects her magical abilities enough to invite her to join his "Slug Club". Ginny becomes a permanent member of the Gryffindor Quidditch team as Chaser, and substitutes for Harry as Seeker when Severus Snape puts him in detention during the Quidditch Cup final. After witnessing Ginny kissing Dean in an empty corridor, Harry has an angry internal reaction. This reaction surprises him and upon reflection, he realizes his attraction to Ginny. Since Ginny's older brother Ron vocally objects to Dean going out with his sister, Harry fears his reaction would be the same, if not worse, with him. Ginny's relationship with Dean ends altogether in April after an accidental nudge from Harry under the effects of Felix Felicis, which Ginny interprets as Dean unnecessarily trying to help her through the portrait hole. Ginny and Harry share their first kiss after Gryffindor again won the Quidditch Cup defeating Ravenclaw, thus starting their relationship. This does not alter Harry's relationship with Ron as he had feared, and they get to enjoy their relationship for a peaceful few months. After Dumbledore's death, Harry ends their relationship as he fears his love for Ginny would place her in danger.

Harry Potter and the Deathly Hallows
Propelled by the revelation that Harry, Ron, and Hermione are leaving to seek the remaining Horcruxes in Deathly Hallows, Ginny kisses Harry in her bedroom, and they realize they both still have intense feelings for each other. She returns to Hogwarts for her sixth year, where she works with Neville and Luna on reuniting Dumbledore's Army. As Ron is on the run with Harry and Hermione, Ginny is forced to go into hiding with her family. Though underage, she takes part in the Battle of Hogwarts despite her mother's and Harry's disapproval. After Harry's supposed death, she, Hermione, and Luna take on Bellatrix Lestrange, who nearly strikes Ginny with a Killing Curse, infuriating Molly Weasley to the point of intervening and successfully duelling Bellatrix herself.

In the epilogue, set 19 years after the events of Deathly Hallows, Harry and Ginny have three children: James, Albus and Lily. Though the epilogue does not explicitly say Ginny and Harry are married, news articles and other sources treat it as fact. Rowling elaborated on Ginny's future after the release of the book, saying that after leaving Hogwarts, she joined the Holyhead Harpies and, after spending a few years as a celebrated player, retired to become the senior Quidditch correspondent at the Daily Prophet, and to start a family with Harry.

In other material
In the play Harry Potter and the Cursed Child, Ginny must help Harry reconcile with their wayward son Albus Severus Potter, and there are references to events in previous books. Her job at The Daily Prophet is briefly mentioned when Draco accuses her of promoting suspicion against former Death Eaters, but she says her articles are purely sport-related.

Characterization

Outward appearance 
She has typical Weasley traits: flaming red hair (which she wears in a long mane) and a freckled complexion. She is of petite stature, commented on by several characters, and has bright brown eyes like her mother. When she blushes (which was often around Harry Potter in the early years of their friendship), she goes a shade of red that matches her hair. When in a highly emotional state she is known to acquire a "hard, blazing look".

Personality 
Ginny is forceful, independent and often speaks her mind. She has an energetic, lively personality; having feelings for Harry, she became shy and withdrawn in his presence, during the first few years of their friendship. According to Harry, growing up with six older brothers toughened her. Ginny is not afraid to stand up to anyone, friend or enemy alike. She stands up to Draco Malfoy on their first meeting in Flourish and Blotts when he insults Harry in Chamber of Secrets. She even stands up to Hermione, her close friend, in defence of Harry's use of the Sectumsempra curse. When describing Ginny, J.K. Rowling notes she is "tough, not in an unpleasant way, but gutsy", also describing her as "warm and compassionate". Ginny was very popular during her time at Hogwarts, and drew attraction by numerous boys. Harry and Ron felt that Ginny was "too popular for her own good".

Magical abilities and skills 
Ginny is a talented witch. By age 14 she could conjure a corporeal Patronus Charm, in the form of a horse. She is also a gifted flier and Quidditch player; she scored "seventeen goals" in a Quidditch practice. Ginny was adept at the Bat-Bogey Hex, which drew her to the attention of Horace Slughorn, and her subsequent invitation to the Slug Club.

Portrayals 
Bonnie Wright played Ginny Weasley in all eight Harry Potter films. Wright voiced the character in the Order of Phoenix, Half-Blood Prince and Deathly Hallows: Part 1 video games. Wright also played Ginny in the Harry Potter and the Forbidden Journey at The Wizarding World of Harry Potter theme park attraction.
Wright has described Ginny's character as "outgoing, friendly and confident." In an interview with The Telegraph before the release of Order of the Phoenix, Wright revealed that she got the role because her brother had read the books and told her she reminded him of Ginny, and recommended that she audition for the part.

Ginny was voiced by Victoire Robinson for the Chamber of Secrets game, and by Annabel Scholey in Deathly Hallows: Part 2. Bonnie Wright lent her voice to her character in Harry Potter and the Half-Blood Prince, and acted as a playable character in certain missions. Poppy Miller played the adult Ginny in the original West End production of Harry Potter and the Cursed Child.

Family tree

Reception
Ginny's pivotal role in Chamber of Secrets was compared by Dave Kopel, citing John Granger's book, to a morality play like John Bunyan's The Pilgrim's Progress. He describes the final scene, where Harry descends to the Chamber of Secrets to rescue Ginny: "In the climax of Chamber of Secrets, Harry descends to a deep underworld, is confronted by two satanic minions (Voldemort and a giant serpent), is saved from certain death by his faith in Dumbledore (the bearded God the Father/Ancient of Days), rescues the virgin (Virginia  Weasley), and ascends in triumph. It's Pilgrim's Progress for a new audience." This quote predates Rowling's revelation that Ginny's full name is Ginevra, not Virginia.

In popular culture
In the 2013 Season 6, Episode 15 of The Big Bang Theory (The Spoiler Alert Segmentation), Leonard has just started reading Half-Blood Prince when Sheldon spoils Dumbledore's death by Snape as well as Dobby's death in Deathly Hallows, which ignites a feud between them. Later, during an effort to patch things up between them, Penny accidentally spoils that Harry and Ginny end up together, trying to draw a comparison between Ron accepting that Harry is interested in Ron's sister Ginny, and Leonard's potential forgiving of Sheldon spoiling key events of the series. Leonard is obviously disappointed that yet another event has been spoiled.

In the 2018 dystopian science fiction film The Darkest Minds, two of the main characters compare their relation to Ginny and Harry's, in a scene Noah Berlatsky describes as "a moment of meta-critique that’s just as likely to make the audience wince as smile.". The film itself was widely panned by critics, Berlatsky himself calling it "flat [and] boring".

References

External links 
 

Harry Potter characters
Child characters in film
Child characters in literature
Literary characters introduced in 1997
Fictional child soldiers
Fictional English people
Fictional female sportspeople
Fictional journalists and mass media people
Fictional members of secret societies
Fictional war veterans
Female characters in film
Female characters in literature
Teenage characters in film
Teenage characters in literature
Film characters introduced in 2001